Hernani may refer to:

Hernani, Eastern Samar, a municipality in Eastern Samar, Philippines
Hernani, Gipuzkoa, a town in Gipuzkoa, Basque Autonomous Community, Spain
Hernani (drama), a Romantic drama by Victor Hugo
Hernani CRE, a Spanish rugby union club

People
Hernani Azevedo Júnior (born 1994), Brazilian association football player
Hernâni Ferreira da Silva (1931-2001), Portuguese association football player
Hernâni José da Rosa (born 1984), Brazilian association football player
Hernâni Jorge Santos Fortes (born 1991), Portuguese association football player
Hernâni Marques (born 1984), computational linguist and hacker
Hernâni Neves (born 1963), Portuguese association football and beach soccer player

See also
Ernani (disambiguation)